The Infinity Gems (originally referred to as Soul Gems and later as Infinity Stones) are six fictional gems appearing in American comic books published by Marvel Comics, named after and embodying various aspects of existence. The gems can grant whoever wields them various powers in accordance to the aspect of existence they represent, and have the potential of turning the wielder into a god-like being when the main 6 (Mind, Power, Reality, Soul, Space, and Time) are held together. Thus, they are among the most powerful and sought-after items in the Marvel Universe; playing important roles in several storylines, in which they were wielded by characters such as Thanos and Adam Warlock. Some of these stories depict additional Infinity Gems or similar objects. Although, the Infinity Gems altogether give its user nigh-omnipotence, the Gems only function on the universe they belong to and not on alternate realities.

The Gems have appeared in several media adaptations outside of comics, including the Marvel Cinematic Universe film franchise, where they are called Infinity Stones and have their colors altered. These changes were later adapted into the comics.

Publication history

The first appearance of an Infinity Gem occurred in 1972 in Marvel Premiere #1. It was originally called a "Soul Gem". In 1976, a second "Soul Gem" appeared in a Captain Marvel story which established that there were six Soul Gems, each with different powers. One year later, two more "Soul Gems" were introduced in a Warlock crossover involving Spider-Man. The main six Gems appeared when the death-obsessed villain Thanos attempted to use them to extinguish every star in the universe. In a 1988 storyline in Silver Surfer vol. 3, the Elders of the Universe tried to use 6 of the "Soul Gems" to steal the energy of the world-eating entity Galactus.

In the 1990 limited series The Thanos Quest, Thanos refers to the entire main set as "Infinity Gems" for the first time. In this storyline, he steals most of the Gems for the second time and reveals the Gems to be the last remains of an omnipotent being. Thanos then places all six main gems within his left gauntlet. In the miniseries The Infinity Gauntlet, Thanos uses the Gems to become nearly omnipotent and kills half the universe's population as a gift to his love, the cosmic embodiment of Death. Although he easily repels an attack by Earth's heroes and other cosmic entities including Eternity, the Gauntlet is eventually stolen from him by Nebula, who undoes the last 24 hours, including his mass killings. Adam Warlock then recovers the Gauntlet and, by order of the Living Tribunal, divides the Gems that fit in the gauntlet among a group he calls "the Infinity Watch", consisting of himself, the superheroes Gamora, Pip the Troll, Drax the Destroyer, Moondragon, and his former adversary Thanos. The group's adventures in defending the Gems appear in the series Warlock and the Infinity Watch (1992–1995).

The 6 main Gems are next gathered by Warlock's evil alter ego, the Magus, in the 1992 limited series The Infinity War, where he is defeated by Warlock and Earth's heroes, including Thanos. In the 1993 limited series The Infinity Crusade, the embodiment of Warlock's goodness, the Goddess, attempts to destroy evil in the universe by destroying free will. The 6 main Gems are then once again retrieved by the Infinity Watch.

Then, 6 of the gems appeared in the crossover between the Marvel universe and the Ultraverse, when the vampiric Rune, stole the gems from the Infinity Watch. The gems were dispersed in the Ultraverse and Loki looked for them. The reunion of the gems with a seventh gem, the Ego Gem, revealed the existence of the entity Nemesis, that said that she was the conscience of the gems. Nemesis was slain and the gems dispersed again.

In a story arc of the Thanos series (2003–2004), Galactus gathers six of the Gems but accidentally allows an interdimensional entity named Hunger access to the Marvel universe. Thanos and Galactus banish the entity and the Gems are scattered again with the exception of the Soul Gem, which Thanos retains for its customary custodian Adam Warlock. In New Avengers: Illuminati, a 2007–2008 limited series, a cabal of Earth's heroes gather the Gems and attempt to wish them out of existence but discover that they must exist as part of the cosmic balance. Instead, the Illuminati divide and hide the Gems.

In a 2010 Avengers storyline, the human criminal known as the Hood steals several Gems but is defeated by use of the remaining Gems; the Illuminati attempt to hide them again. The Illuminati later wield the 6 main Gems to stop another universe from collapsing into their own but the cost of this however, was the destruction of the gauntlet and all gems minus the Time Gem which simply disappeared. Afterwards, the previously vanished Time Gem appears to Captain America and some of the Avengers and transports them into future realities, shattering time in the process.

As a result of the Incursions, the entire Multiverse is destroyed. However, Doctor Doom combines fragments of several alternate realities into Battleworld. Doctor Strange gathers the 6 main Infinity Gems from various realities into a new Infinity Gauntlet, which he leaves hidden until the surviving heroes of Earth-616 return. The Gauntlet is subsequently claimed by T'Challa (the Black Panther), who uses it to keep the Beyonder-enhanced Doom occupied until Mister Fantastic can disrupt his power source.

Following the recreation of the Multiverse, the Infinity Gems (now known as the Infinity Stones) are recreated and scattered across the universe, with their colors switched and some taking on uncut ingot forms. In Marvel Legacy #1, the Space Stone (now colored blue) appears on Earth where a Frost Giant working for Loki steals it from a S.H.I.E.L.D. storage facility, however he is intercepted and defeated by a resurrected Wolverine. Star-Lord discovers an extra-large Power Stone (now colored purple) being protected by the Nova Corps, and an alternate universe Peter Quill named Starkill has the Reality Stone (now colored red). A future version of Ghost Rider is revealed to possess a shard of the Time Stone (now colored green), while in the present the complete stone restores the ruined planet of Sakaar and is claimed by the Super-Skrull. The Mind Stone (now colored yellow) is found on Earth in the hands of petty crook Turk Barrett, and the Soul Stone (now colored orange) is mentioned to Adam Warlock to be in the hands of his dark aspect, the Magus; however, Ultron is able to claim it after ambushing and killing him. The Stones are shown to have a pocket universe existing within each of them. Loki would later discover the Stones are originated from the primordial universe where Celestials reside, guarding a deposit of countless Infinity Stones which they infuse with their cosmic energy and deliver to different realities across the Multiverse. Adam Warlock would use the Soul Stone to grant sentience to each of the Stones, which then travel the universe, finding a suitable host and bonding with them.

Description

Each Gem is shaped like a small oval and is named after, and represents, a different characteristic of existence. Possessing any single Gem grants the user the ability to exert great control over the aspect of existence the Gem represents. If a user is able to tap into the full potential of a Gem, the user gains complete control over a Gem's aspect of existence. The Gems are not immutable. For instance, on two occasions, one or more of the Gems have appeared as deep pink spheres several feet in diameter, while on other occasions, the Gems have appeared in their small oval shape but with different coloring. (e.g. the Soul Gem being colored red when worn by the Gardener). In the Ultraverse, after merging into their original form of Nemesis, the Gems were again separated after a battle with Ultraforce and the Avengers. As part of the Marvel Legacy initiative, the Infinity Gems (now known as the Infinity Stones), had their colors altered to match the colors of the Infinity Stones from the Marvel Cinematic Universe. 

The Seven infinity Gems include:

Additional Gems have appeared in crossover media and alternate universes outside the Marvel Universe.

Other versions

Council of Reeds
The Reed Richards of Earth-616, in an attempt to "solve everything", meets with a council of alternate universe Reeds. Three of them wear Infinity Gauntlets, and they learn that the gauntlets only work in their respective universes  of origin..

Contest of Champions
In the Contest of Champions miniseries, an alternate version of Tony Stark uses the Reality Gem to win the superhero civil war and affect the outcome of a presidential election. When he tries to use the Gem on Battleworld, he is killed by the Maestro, who says the Gems do not work in any universe other than their own.

Heroes Reborn (2021)
In an alternate reality depicted in the Heroes Reborn miniseries, the Infinity Gems are in the possession of Thanos, who has them placed in his Infinity Rings.

New Avengers
During the "Incursion" storyline, the Avengers travel to a parallel Earth where a pastiche of the Justice League have replaced this Earth's Avengers who all died in a previous cataclysm. Here the Gems are all square planes of "forever glass" which are assembled into the "Wishing Cube", a composite of the concepts of the Infinity Gems and the Cosmic Cube.

Secret Wars
After various alternate universes are combined into Battleworld, Doctor Strange gathers Infinity Gems from other universes into a new Infinity Gauntlet that works in the area where Doom has built his palace. Strange leaves the Gauntlet hidden until he has access to someone he can trust it with. After his death, the Gauntlet is claimed by T'Challa, who uses it against Doom in the final battle.

A separate section of Battleworld known as New Xandar also has a Gauntlet fought over by multiple factions until the majority of the Stones, except the Reality Stone, were taken by Thanos. Thanos eventually tracks the missing Stone to Nova Corps member Anwen Bakian. When Thanos confronts her to get the Stone, Anwen gives him a duplicate of the Reality Stone she created called the 'Death Stone'. When used along with the other five Stones, the Death Stone corrupts Thanos with black matter and turns him to dust.

Ultimate Marvel
In the Ultimate Marvel universe, an Infinity Gauntlet is seen in Project Pegasus. The Mind Gem (stolen by Hydra) is used by Modi (Thor's son) to control both Director Flumm and Cassie Lang, but are stopped by the Ultimates. The Power Gem is later revealed to be in the possession of former S.H.I.E.L.D. agent Sayuri Kyota, while a second Infinity Gauntlet is recovered from an A.I.M. base by Thor and Susan Storm. Kang the Conqueror later allies himself with the Hulk, Reed Richards and Quicksilver as part of a plan to steal the two Gauntlets, which results in the destruction of the Triskelion. Quicksilver recovers two additional Gems allowing the villains to teleport away. Richards is later able to recover another of the Gems, which is found lodged in Tony Stark's brain. He informs Stark that the Infinity Gems are needed to save the world from a coming cataclysm that will destroy the entire universe. After brainwashing Johnny Storm and forcing him to travel to the Earth's core, the Dark Ultimates are able to recover the final gem, but are defeated by the Ultimates. The gems then shatter, rendering the Gauntlets useless.

What If?
In a reality where Doctor Doom retained the power of the Beyonder, Doom acquired the Infinity Gems from the Elders of the Universe and used them to defeat the Celestials in a 407-year-long war before finally forsaking his power.

In an alternate reality where the original Fantastic Four died, a new Fantastic Four – consisting of Spider-Man, Hulk, Wolverine, and Ghost Rider – was formed. With Iron Man replacing Ghost Rider, they were the only heroes available to fight Thanos when he initially assembled the Infinity Gauntlet. Despite Iron Man's use of Negative Zone-enhanced Celestial armor, Thanos still easily defeated the team until Wolverine tricked Thanos into erasing Mephisto from existence before cutting off Thanos's left arm, and therefore the Infinity Gauntlet. With Thanos powerless, Spider-Man used the gauntlet to undo the events of Thanos's godhood.

In other media

Television
 The Infinity Gauntlet, Infinity Gems, and an original weapon called the "Infinity Sword" appear in The Super Hero Squad Show. After Iron Man and Doctor Doom destroy the Infinity Sword while attempting to claim it, season one sees the titular squad collecting the sword's fragments, or "Infinity Fractals", before Doctor Doom's Lethal Legion does. While Doom rebuilds the Infinity Sword, the Silver Surfer tells him that it is useless without the Infinity Gauntlet before taking the sword out to space. Season two sees Thanos attempting to collect the Infinity Stones for his Infinity Gauntlet until the Silver Surfer, corrupted into the Dark Surfer by the sword, steals the completed gauntlet from him. After the Super Hero Squad defeat the Dark Surfer, the gems and sword are destroyed, sending Infinity Fractals across the universe.
 The Infinity Gauntlet and five of the Infinity Stones appear in Avengers Assemble. This version of the Infinity Gauntlet has slots for five of the stones as the Soul Stone was in Adam Warlock's possession and Thanos feared him.
 The Soul Stone appears in Guardians of the Galaxy.

Marvel Cinematic Universe

The Infinity Gems, renamed Infinity Stones, play important roles in the first three phases of the Marvel Cinematic Universe (MCU), referred to collectively as the "Infinity Saga". The Infinity Stones also make minor appearances in the Phase Four television series Loki, WandaVision, and What If...?. In the “Multiverse Saga”, it is revealed that the respective universe’s stones can’t be destroyed by anything from another universe.

Video games
 The Infinity Gems appear in Marvel Super Heroes.
 The Infinity Gems appear in Marvel Super Heroes in War of the Gems.
 The Power, Soul, Reality, and Space Stones appear in Marvel vs. Capcom 2: New Age of Heroes.
 The Infinity Gems and Infinity Sword appear in Marvel Super Hero Squad: The Infinity Gauntlet.
 The Infinity Stones and Infinity Gauntlet make a cameo appearance in the end of Lego Marvel's Avengers.
 The Infinity Stones and Infinity Gauntlet appear in Fortnite Battle Royale.
 The Infinity Stones appear in Marvel vs. Capcom: Infinite. In the game's story, Ultron and Sigma use the Space and Reality Stones to fuse themselves into Ultron Sigma and merge the Marvel and Capcom universes into one under their control, leading to the heroes of both universes joining forces to retrieve the remaining Infinity Stones before Ultron Sigma. While Thanos unknowingly destroys the Reality Stone while fighting Ultron Sigma, X destroys the hybrid villain before the heroes build a new society.
 The Infinity Stones and a suit of "Infinity Armor", of which the Infinity Gauntlet is a part of, appear in Marvel Ultimate Alliance 3: The Black Order. These versions of the Stones and the Armor came into existence at the Heart of Infinity, near the center of the universe. Additionally, using them together will make the user unstable and cause them to progressively kill themselves and all life in the universe.

Miscellaneous
 From January to August 2012, Wizkids presented the Infinity Gauntlet program at stores that host HeroClix tournaments. An Infinity Gauntlet prop was released, followed by a different Gem each month, each of which can be added to the Gauntlet to increase its power. Additionally, the Gems can be displayed on a stand that comes with the Gauntlet or on each Elder that Thanos encountered in the story Thanos Quest.
 Replica Infinity Gauntlets were given out as trophies at Ultimate Fighting Game Tournament 8, a Road to Evo tournament held in 2012.

References

External links
 
 Infinity Stones from Marvel Cinematic Database